Stephen Shalders (born 24 December 1981 in Bridgend) is a Welsh triple jumper.

He finished tenth at the 2000 World Junior Championships, and at the 2002 Commonwealth Games he finished sixth in the triple jump and eighth in the 4x100 metres relay. He then won the silver medal at the 2005 Universiade and finished tenth at the 2006 Commonwealth Games.

His personal best jump is 16.71 metres, achieved in September 2005 in Manchester.

References

1981 births
Living people
Sportspeople from Bridgend
British male triple jumpers
Welsh triple jumpers
Commonwealth Games competitors for Wales
Athletes (track and field) at the 2002 Commonwealth Games
Athletes (track and field) at the 2006 Commonwealth Games
Universiade medalists in athletics (track and field)
Universiade silver medalists for Great Britain
Medalists at the 2005 Summer Universiade